Girls Under 21 is a 1940 American drama film directed by Max Nosseck, starring Bruce Cabot and Rochelle Hudson.

Plot summary

Frances White (Rochelle Hudson) from the slums, escapes the  tenements by marrying rich gangster Smiley Ryan (Bruce Cabot).

Cast

 Bruce Cabot as Smiley Ryan
 Rochelle Hudson as Frances White Ryan
 Paul Kelly as Johnny Cane
 Tina Thayer as Jennie White
 Roberta Smith as Sloppy Krupnik
 Lois Verner as Fatso Cheruzzi
 Beryl Vaughan as Marge Dolan
 Joanne Tree as Gertie Dolan
 Debbie Ellis as Tessa Mangione
 William Edmunds as Tony Mangione
 John Dilson as Albert Carter, School Principal
 John Tyrrell as Rusty

References

External links
 
 
 
 

1940 films
American black-and-white films
1940s English-language films
Films set in 1940
American drama films
American detective films
1940 drama films
Films directed by Max Nosseck
Columbia Pictures films
1940s American films